Volleyball events were contested at the 1982 Asian Games in New Delhi, India.

Medalists

Medal table

Final standing

Men

Women

References

Men's results
Women's results

 
1982 Asian Games events
1982
Asian Games
Asian Games